The 2020–21 Miami Hurricanes women's basketball team represented the University of Miami during the 2020–21 NCAA Division I women's basketball season. The Hurricanes were led by sixteenth-year head coach Katie Meier and played their home games at the Watsco Center as members of the Atlantic Coast Conference.

The Hurricanes finished the season 11–11 and 8–10 in ACC play to finish in a tie for ninth place.  As the tenth seed in the ACC tournament, they lost to Virginia Tech in the Second Round.  They were not invited to the NCAA tournament or the WNIT.

Previous season

For the 2019–20 season, the Hurricanes finished 15–15 and 7–11 in ACC play to finish in a tie for eleventh place.  As the eleventh seed in the ACC tournament, they lost to Clemson in the First Round.  The NCAA tournament and WNIT were cancelled due to the COVID-19 outbreak.

Off-season

Departures

Incoming transfers

Recruiting Class

Source:

Roster

Schedule

Source

|-
!colspan=9 style="background:#005030; color:#F47321;"| Non-conference regular season

|-
!colspan=9 style="background:#005030; color:#F47321;"| ACC regular season

|-
!colspan=9 style="background:#005030; color:#F47321;"| ACC Women's Tournament

Rankings

The Coaches Poll releases a final poll after the NCAA tournament, but the AP Poll does not release a poll at this time.  The Coaches Poll does not release a week 2 poll.

References

Miami Hurricanes women's basketball seasons
Miami
Miami Hurricanes women's basketball team
Miami Hurricanes women's basketball team